Luis Jacinto Muñoz (born August 19, 1953) is a Costa Rican percussionist, producer, arranger and composer. He is a multiple-time ACAM Award winner.

Education 
After graduating from high school in 1971, Muñoz entered the University of Costa Rica, where he studied architecture. At the same time, he enrolled at the National Conservatory of Music, where he took flute lessons with the principal flutist of the National Symphony Orchestra.

In 1974, Muñoz immigrated to the United States. He enrolled at the University of California, Santa Barbara, and studied composition with Peter Racine Fricker and Stephen Hartke.

Career 
Muñoz began his musical career as a rock & roll drummer in his native Costa Rica. In 1968, he formed his first band, The King Kats. Their recording Midnight Sunshine became a number one hit in 1968 and became one of the first original rock & roll songs ever recorded by a Costa Rican group.

Muñoz's involvement in other projects of importance in the national music scene followed, including playing drums with Jazz pianist Pibe Hine, forming the Trio de Rock Acústico with singer and songwriters Alvaro Fernández and Pamela Johnson, and acting as arranger, co-producer, and performer in Compadre, a record by Alvaro Fernandez.
Muñoz's first compositions were in 1975. After finishing his formal studies at UCSB, he started the band Pelin. In 1980, Muñoz  was invited by the Costa Rican Government. He toured the entire country performing and recording music.

In 1995, Muñoz was signed by Fahrenheit/Jazz, a record label out of Denver, Colorado.  His 1996 CD, The Fruit of Eden, marked the beginning of his recording career. In 1998, Muñoz released his second project, Compassion. Then in 2004, he created his record label, Pelín Music, and released Vida.

In 2011, Muñoz won his second ACAM Award for Jazz Composer of the Year with  Invisible (2010). In 2015, Muñoz released a vocal record Voz which won him  2 ACAM Awards (Jazz Record of the Year and Best Sound Engineering), plus a nomination for a third award, for Producer of the Year.

In 2017, Muñoz recorded, The Dead Man, originally inspired by a short story of the same name by Uruguayan author Horacio Quiroga. The Dead Man won the fifth ACAM award for Best Instrumental Record of the year.

In 2019 Muñoz collaborated with Guyanese singer Lois Mahalia and released The Infinite Dream, his first vocal project in English.

Nominations & Awards 
 2004 ACAM Award winner for Jazz Composer/Producer of the Year
 2011 ACAM Award winner for Jazz Record of the Year.
 2013 ACAM Award nomination for Jazz Record of the Year.
 2013 Best Latin Jazz Album of the Year (W. Royal Stokes/Jazz Journalists Association)
 2015 ACAM Award winner for Jazz Record of the Year.
 2015 ACAM Award winner for Sound Engineer of the Year.
 2015 ACAM Award for Jazz Producer of the Year.
 2017 ACAM Award winner for Instrumental Record of the Year 2020.
 Best Record of the Year (Mark Holston/Jazziz Magazine)
 3 ACAM Award nominations for Jazz Record of the Year, Producer of the Year, and Arranger of the Year. ACAM Award for Producer of the Year.

Discography

Solo

References

External links
 Luis Jacinto Muñoz on LinkedIn

1953 births
Living people
Costa Rican composers
Costa Rican musicians
Costa Rican male singers